Providence Clamdiggers may refer to:

Providence Clamdiggers (baseball), 1894 American minor league baseball team
Providence Clamdiggers (soccer), 1920s American soccer team